Antimima buchubergensis is a species of plant in the family Aizoaceae. It is endemic to Namibia.  Its natural habitats are subtropical or tropical dry shrubland and rocky areas.

References

Flora of Namibia
buchubergensis
Least concern plants
Taxonomy articles created by Polbot
Taxa named by Kurt Dinter